Nijkerk is a railway station located in Nijkerk, Netherlands. The station was opened on 20 August 1863 and is located on the Utrecht–Kampen railway (Centraalspoorweg). The services are operated by Nederlandse Spoorwegen. From 1903, Nijkerk was also the northern terminus of the Nijkerk–Ede-Wageningen railway. The section between Nijkerk and Barneveld was closed and demolished in 1937.

Train services
The following train services call at Nijkerk:

Bus services

References

External links
NS website 
Dutch Public Transport journey planner 

Railway stations in Gelderland
Railway stations on the Centraalspoorweg
Railway stations opened in 1863
Nijkerk